Padang Besa or Padang Besar is a border town on the Malaysia-Thailand border in the Sadao District, Songkhla Province, Thailand. Since 2004 the municipality has had town status (thesaban mueang) and covers parts of the sub-district (tambon) Padang Besa. In 2007 it had a population of 13,748.

There is a road and rail border crossing into Malaysia in Padang Besar. The road checkpoint is about 1 km outside town on the road to Sadao. The town on the Malaysian side is also known as Padang Besar. All rail passenger formalities, including for exiting Thailand, are carried out in the Malaysian Padang Besar railway station where there is an integrated customs, immigration, and quarantine checkpoint for both countries. There is also local train station with the same name Padang Besar railway station and passengers need to be careful not to confuse between the two stations.

History
The municipality was created as a sanitary district (sukhaphiban) in 1967. Like all sanitary districts, it was upgraded to a sub-district municipality (thesaban tambon) in 1999. Effective 8 November 2004 it was upgraded to town status (thesaban mueang).

Gallery

References

External links

Populated places in Songkhla province
Malaysia–Thailand border crossings